Woollcombe is a surname. Notable people with the surname include:

Charles Woollcombe KCB KCMG (1857–1934), British Army General during World War I
Harry Woollcombe (1869–1941), the inaugural Bishop of Whitby from 1923 until 1939
Henry Woollcombe (1813–1865), Archdeacon of Barnstaple from 1865 until his death
Jocelyn Woollcombe, DBE (1898–1986), Director of the Women's Royal Naval Service from 1946 to 1950
Kenneth Woollcombe (1924–2008), Anglican academic who was Bishop of Oxford in the middle part of his career, from 1971 to 1978
Stephen Woollcombe, Progressive Conservative Party of Canada candidate in the 2000 Canadian federal election

See also 
 Woolcombe